Salvador Luis Amílcar Breglia Luna (15 September 1935 – 17 January 2014) was a Paraguayan football defender/midfielder and coach.

Career
Breglia was born in Caazapá, where he started his career in the youth divisions of Club 25 de Enero and then Club Nanawa. He then moved to Cerro Porteño and made his debut at the age of 16. He would win several national championships while at Cerro and was part of the Paraguay national football team from 1960 to 1967.

As a coach, he managed Cerro Porteño, Paranaense, Libertad, Sol de América, Limpio and Teniente Fariña of Guarambaré. Breglia was also part of the coaching staff for the Paraguay national team at the 1986 FIFA World Cup.

He died in Asunción, aged 78.

Titles

As player

As coach

References

1935 births
2014 deaths
People from Caazapá
Paraguayan people of Italian descent
Paraguay international footballers
Paraguayan footballers
Cerro Porteño players
Paraguayan football managers
Cerro Porteño managers
Association football defenders
Association football midfielders
Club Libertad managers
Club Sol de América managers
Sportivo Luqueño managers